City of Fire may refer to:

 "City of Fire" (Thunderbirds), an episode of the TV series Thunderbirds
 City of Fire (band), a groove metal band from Canada
 City of Fire (album), a 2010 album by the band
 City of Fire (novel), a 2002 novel by T.H. Lain

See also 
 City on Fire (disambiguation)